Paul Leopold Haffner (21 January 1829, Horb am Neckar – 2 November 1899, Mainz) was a German Roman Catholic clergyman. From 1866 until his death he served as Bishop of Mainz.

References

External links
http://www.catholic-hierarchy.org/bishop/bhaffner.html 

1829 births
1899 deaths
Bishops of Mainz (1802-present)
People from Horb am Neckar
19th-century German Roman Catholic bishops